Cheryl Blackman (born 28 June 1957) is a Barbadian hurdler. She competed in the women's 400 metres hurdles at the 1984 Summer Olympics.

References

1957 births
Living people
Athletes (track and field) at the 1984 Summer Olympics
Barbadian female hurdlers
Olympic athletes of Barbados
Place of birth missing (living people)